The Lex Krupp was a document signed into law on 12 November 1943 by Adolf Hitler that made the Krupp company a personal company with specially regulated rules of succession in order to ensure that the Krupp family enterprise remain intact.

History

This specialized German law of 1943 was created through the combined efforts of Gustav Krupp von Bohlen und Halbach, the head of the steel concern Fried. Krupp AG Essen, Martin Bormann, Chief of the Nazi Party Chancellery, Dr. Hans Lammers, Chief of the Reich Chancellery, and Hitler, in order to establish a legal mandate for the preservation of the Krupp family enterprise, so that Gustav's son and heir, Alfried Krupp von Bohlen und Halbach, would be heretofore addressed as Krupp von Bohlen und Halbach. This law was signed by Hitler on 12 November 1943, and became effective immediately, thus transferring ownership from Bertha Krupp to the first male heir of Bertha Krupp and Gustav Krupp von Bohlen und Halbach.

References

The Arms of Krupp by William Manchester

Krupp
Orders by Adolf Hitler
1943 documents